The Swing School is a 1938 Fleischer Studios animated short film directed by Dave Fleischer and starring Betty Boop.

Synopsis
At Betty Boop's Music School for Animals, Pudgy the dog doesn't do so well, but the puppy love triumphs.

References

External links
The Swing School on Youtube
The Swing School at the  Big Cartoon Database.

1938 films
Betty Boop cartoons
1930s American animated films
American black-and-white films
1938 animated films
Paramount Pictures short films
Short films directed by Dave Fleischer
Fleischer Studios short films
Films set in schools